Kjelfrid Brusveen (23 November 1926 – 3 January 2009) was a Norwegian cross-country skier.

She was born in Fåberg, and represented Faaberg IL. She competed at the 1956 Winter Olympics in Cortina d'Ampezzo, where she placed 10th in the 10 kilometres, and fourth in the 3 × 5 km relay with the Norwegian team.

Cross-country skiing results

Olympic Games

References

External links

1926 births
2009 deaths
Sportspeople from Lillehammer
Cross-country skiers at the 1956 Winter Olympics
Norwegian female cross-country skiers
Olympic cross-country skiers of Norway